Mabel Hampton (May 2, 1902 – October 26, 1989) was an American lesbian activist, a dancer during the Harlem Renaissance, and a volunteer for both Black and lesbian/gay organizations. She was a significant contributor to the Lesbian Herstory Archives.

Early life 

Mabel Hampton was born in Winston-Salem, North Carolina, May 2, 1902. Her mother died when she was two months old from poison; consequently, she was raised for 7 years by her maternal grandmother. After her grandmother died from a stroke, Hampton, at age 7, boarded a train to New York City. She lived there with her aunt and uncle for a short time.

However, Hampton received poor treatment from this side of her family, even experiencing sexual assault from her uncle. She ran away after a year, and found a white family in New Jersey to live with from ages 8 to 17.

In 1919, while attending a women-only party in Harlem, Hampton was falsely imprisoned for sex work and was sentenced time in the Bedford Hills Correctional Facility for Women. She viewed her imprisonment as being lesbian encoded. Hampton was released after spending 13 months of her 3-year sentence. The condition of her release forbid her from being in New York.

Later life and career 

In the 1920s, Hampton danced in exclusively Black productions alongside Harlem Renaissance stars, such as Gladys Bentley. She performed at the club "The Garden of Joy" and sang in the Lafayette Theater Chorus. Hampton was able to connect with other dancers, artists, gays, and lesbians through this work.

Hampton left the chorus lines once demand diminished. She then became a cleaning woman and hospital attendant who worked for white families, and retained this career for a long time. Hampton met Joan Nestle at this time, the daughter of one of these families, and developed a strong friendship with her.

Mabel Hampton met Lillian B. Foster (November 13, 1894 – August 7, 1978) in 1932, who would be her lover of 46 years. They had a loving, lasting relationship; Hampton said she called Foster "Little Bear", and Foster called her "Big Bear." They remained a couple up until Foster died in 1978.

Hampton then participated in the New York Defense Recreation Committee (1943), in which she collected cigarettes and other "refreshing" items for American World War II soldiers. She did this alongside her lesbian contemporaries.

Hampton was an activist for gay and lesbian rights. She joined the Lesbian Herstory Archives in New York City in the mid 70s, an organization co-founded by her good friend, Joan Nestle. She contributed many physical artifacts and participated in several oral history recordings for the Archives. Hampton also worked for SAGE, an organization dedicated to providing for and supporting elderly queer folk.

Hampton was able to contribute to the Martin Luther King Memorial Fund as well as gay and lesbian organizations in spite of her working-class income. She also attended performances of the Negro Opera Company, and appeared in the films Silent Pioneers and Before Stonewall, which both document the struggle for obtaining gay rights. In addition to this, Hampton marched in the National March on Washington for Lesbian and Gay Rights, which took place in 1979. She spoke at the New York City Lesbian and Gay Pride Parade in 1984, in which she said: "I, Mabel Hampton, have been a lesbian all my life, for 82 years, and I am proud of myself and my people. I would like all my people to be free in this country and all over the world, my gay people and my Black people." She was also named the grand marshal for the New York City Gay Pride March in 1985. The same year, she received a lifetime achievement award from the National Coalition of Black Lesbians and Gays. Hampton also attended OLOC (Old Lesbians Organizing for Change)'s first West Coast Conference in 1987, in which she shared personal stories.

Hampton died from pneumonia on October 26, 1989 at St. Luke's-Roosevelt Hospital Center.

Legacy 
She was included after her death within the documentary Not Just Passing Through.

Hampton donated invaluable memorabilia, ephemera, letters, academic publications, documentary records, and lesbian pulp fiction which she had collected throughout her career to the Lesbian Herstory Archives in 1976. These archival materials helped provide a lens as to what life was like for Black lesbians in the time of the Harlem Renaissance. Many of these resources are viewable at the LHA in-person.

Following her passing, Hampton was featured in the front pages of the Lesbian Herstory Archives Newsletter #11, January 1990, in which her legacy was honored.

Joan Nestle, after recording Hampton's oral histories in the late seventies, delivered "I Lift My Eyes to the Hill": the Life of Mabel Hampton as Told by a White Woman, the first Kessler Lecture for the CUNY Center for Lesbian and Gay Studies, in 1992.

External links 
 Not Just Passing Through
 Lesbian Herstory Archives History
 Themstory: Mabel Hampton
 Old Lesbians Organizing for Change (OLOC)
 "I Lift My Eyes to the Hill": the Life of Mabel Hampton as Told by a White Woman

Further reading

References

1902 births
1989 deaths
African-American female dancers
American female dancers
African-American dancers
Harlem Renaissance
LGBT African Americans
LGBT people from New York (state)
LGBT people from North Carolina
20th-century American dancers
20th-century African-American women
20th-century African-American people
African-American Catholics
Lesbian dancers
LGBT Roman Catholics
Roman Catholic activists
20th-century American LGBT people